In the election for the Twelfth Legislative Assembly of Himachal Pradesh, held 4 November  2012, the Congress Party secured a victory. The Congress won 36, while the Bharatiya Janata Party won 26 of the 68 seats.

Members of the Assembly (2012-2017)

See also 
Government of Himachal Pradesh
Eighth Assembly
Ninth Assembly
Tenth Assembly
Eleventh Assembly

References 

Himachal Pradesh Legislative Assembly